Joseph Trumbull Stickney (June 20, 1874 – October 11, 1904) was an American classical scholar and poet.

Biography
He was born in Geneva and spent much of his early life in Europe. He attended Harvard University from 1891, when he became editor of the Harvard Monthly and a member of Signet Society, to 1895, when he graduated magna cum laude. He then studied for seven years in Paris, taking a doctorate at the Sorbonne. He wrote there two dissertations, a Latin one on the Venetian humanist Ermolao Barbaro, and the other on Les Sentences dans la Poésie Grecque d'Homère à Euripide. The latter is openly indebted to The Birth of Tragedy and to Stickney's study of the Bhagavad Gita under the tutelage of Sylvain Lévi. Stickney's was the first American docteur ès lettres.

He then published a first book of verse Dramatic Verses (1902) and took a position as Instructor in Classics at Harvard (1903), but died in Boston of a brain tumour a year later. Stickney belongs to the number of Harvard poets (or the Harvard Pessimists) who died young, such as Thomas Parker Sanborn, George Cabot Lodge, Philip Henry Savage and Hugh McCulloch.

Stickney's poem "Song" (which describes the earth ebullient in late spring, and the cuckoo singing "not yet") is plagiarized in the Robert De Niro 2006 film The Good Shepherd by a Yale professor of English, acted by Michael Gambon as Dr. Fredericks, in a failed attempt to seduce the protagonist, portrayed by Matt Damon.

Works

Dramatic Verses (1902)
Les Sentences dans la Poésie Grècque d'Homère à Euripide (1903)
The poems of Trumbull Stickney (1905) edited by George Cabot Lodge; William Vaughn Moody, and John Ellerton Lodge
Trumbull Stickney (1973) edited by Amberys R. Whittle
Poem 'Mnemosyne'

References

Homage to Trumbull Stickney: Poems (1968) edited by James Reeves and Seán Haldane
The fright of time: Joseph Trumbull Stickney 1874-1904 (1970) by Seán Haldane
The Country I Remember (1940) by Edmund Wilson in The New Republic

External links
 
 
 "Trumbull Stickney," poem by Jared Carter
 Les sentences dans la poésie grecque d'Homère à Euripide at Archive.org
 Poems by Trumbull Stickney at English Poetry

American classical scholars
20th-century American poets
1874 births
1904 deaths
Harvard University alumni
University of Paris alumni
Sonneteers
19th-century American poets
American male poets
19th-century American male writers
20th-century American male writers
Writers from Geneva
American expatriates in Switzerland
American expatriates in France